Summit Township is a township in Clay County, Iowa, USA.  As of the 2000 census, its population was 452. Spencer Municipal Airport is located in the township.

History
Summit Township was created in 1872.

Geography 
According to the USGS, it contains one cemetery, Evergreen.

Economy 
At one point Great Lakes Airlines was headquartered in the township.

Notes

References 
 USGS Geographic Names Information System (GNIS)

External links 
 US-Counties.com
 City-Data.com

Townships in Clay County, Iowa
Townships in Iowa